Ghased may refer to:

 Ghased (bomb), an Iranian smartbomb
 Ghased (rocket), an Iranian satellite launch vehicle
 Ghassed, a series of Iranian guided bombs

See also
 Courier
 Qasid (disambiguation)
 Qased (disambiguation) 
 قاصد (disambiguation)